Balfour Castle was a baronial mansion at Balfour Mains, near Kirkton of Kingoldrum, Angus, Scotland. The castle which was built in the 16th century is largely demolished except for a six-storey circular tower. A farm house has been built incorporating some of the ruins in c. 1845. The farmhouse and castle remains were designated as a Category B listed building in 1971.

References

Castles in Angus, Scotland
Castle, Angus
Category B listed buildings in Angus, Scotland